Phùng Trương Trân Đài (born August 26, 1992) is a model and beauty queen Vietnam. She is Miss International Queen Vietnam 2020 and she will represent Vietnam at Miss International Queen 2022 taking place in Thailand.

Career

2009–2014: Early career
Since 2009, Trân Đài has participated in fashion and magazine photoshoots with famous actors and models.

2015–2019: Living and working in the United States
In 2015, Trân Đài went to the US to live and study. She graduated from Asian-American International Beauty College with a degree in skin care. During this time, she also participated in fashion shows in Vietnam and events for the Vietnamese community.

2020–present: Career development, Miss International Queen Vietnam 2020
In 2020, Trân Đài returned to Vietnam from the US to participate in the Miss International Queen Vietnam 2020. This is also the first time Trân Đài revealed that she is transgender. She won the pageant and will represent Vietnam at Miss International Queen 2021.

References

Vietnamese beauty pageant winners
1992 births
Living people
Transgender women
Miss International Queen contestants